
Gmina Lubraniec is an urban-rural gmina (administrative district) in Włocławek County, Kuyavian-Pomeranian Voivodeship, in north-central Poland.

Villages
Apart from the town of Lubraniec, Gmina Lubraniec contains the villages and settlements of Agnieszkowo, Annowo, Bielawy, Biernatki, Bodzanowo, Borek, Czajno, Dąbie Kujawskie, Dąbie Poduchowne, Dęby Janiszewskie, Dobierzyn, Florianowo, Gołębin-Parcele, Gołębin-Wieś, Górniak, Janiszewo, Józefowo, Kazanie, Kłobia, Kłobia Nowa, Kolonia Łódź, Kolonia Piaski, Koniec, Korzeszynek, Krowice, Lubrańczyk, Lubraniec-Parcele, Marysin, Milżyn, Milżynek, Ossowo, Piaski, Rabinowo, Redecz Kalny, Redecz Wielki-Parcele, Redecz Wielki-Wieś, Sarnowo, Siarczyce, Siemnówek, Skaszyn, Smogorzewo, Stok, Sułkowo, Świątniki, Turowo, Wola Sosnowa, Zgłowiączka and Żydowo.

Neighbouring gminas
Gmina Lubraniec is bordered by the gminas of Boniewo, Brześć Kujawski, Choceń, Izbica Kujawska, Osięciny, Topólka and Włocławek.

References
Polish official population figures 2006

Lubraniec
Włocławek County